John Malcolm Henricks (born 6 June 1935) is an Australian Olympic swimmer who won two gold medals at the 1956 Summer Olympics in Melbourne.  Henricks set world records in two freestyle events.

Career
Henricks began his competitive swimming career as a distance freestyle swimmer. He scored his first notable successes at the 1952 Australian national championships, when he came third in the 1500 meters, second in the 800 meters, and first in the 400 meters. A prolonged ear infection kept him off the 1952 Australian Olympic team. His coach Harry Gallagher converted him to sprint freestyle events, and he bettered the Olympic record for 100 meters at the 1953 Australian national championships. He held the 100 meters long-course world record for five years, winning gold medals in the 100 metres and 4×200-metre freestyle relay at the 1956 Summer Olympics in Melbourne. During those five years, he lowered the pre-existing record by almost two seconds.

During that time, he won ten Australian individual championships in those events, two British Empire Games medals and establishing new records in 1954, the Japanese Nationals, the Keo Nakama meet in Hawaii, the Philippine Nationals, and broke two American records while on a visit in 1954. He was named Australian Athlete of the Year by the Helms Hall of Fame in 1955. In 1958, he won the American outdoor national championships in the 100 and 200 meters.

After the 1956 Olympics, Henricks enrolled in the University of Southern California (USC), where he was a member of the USC Trojans swimming team. As a freshman at USC, he teamed with Murray Rose, Don Reddington, Tom Winters and Denis Devine, a five-man freshman team that broke the New Haven Swim Club's dynastic grasp on the Amateur Athletic Union (AAU) indoor championships. The USC freshman team grew into a collegiate powerhouse in the late 1950s and 1960s, dominating the Pacific-8 Conference, winning the National Collegiate Athletic Association (NCAA) team championship in 1960, and laying the groundwork for greater success.

In 1960 Henricks made another attempt at the Olympics, winning the Australian trials handily. Henricks contracted a gastrointestinal ailment at the Olympics in Rome and was eliminated in Semi Final 2, finishing fourth. Australian John Devitt and American Lance Larson were left to contend. Both were teammates; Larson on his USC team, Devitt on his Australian team.

Personal life
Henricks married an American girl, Bonnie Wilkie, sister of his USC teammate Mike Wilkie, in 1960. The Australian and American Olympic swim teams attended the wedding, which produced a photograph of Olympic rivals Larson and Devitt hugging each other. Henricks attended Fort Street Boys' High School in Petersham, NSW.

Achievements

 1952 Australian Championships: gold medal in 400m freestyle, silver in 800m freestyle, bronze in 1500m freestyle
 Australian Athlete of the year in 1955
 1956 Olympic Games: Gold medals in 100m freestyle and 4 × 200 m freestyle relay
 1953-1958 Australian Championships: 10 gold medals in 100m freestyle and 4 × 200 m freestyle relay
 British Empire Games: 2 medals
 Japanese Nationals: 1 medal
 Keo Nakam meet: 1 medal
 Philippine Nationals: 1 medal
 American Nationals (outdoor): 100m and 200m freestyle medals in 1958
 American Records: 2
 Inducted into the International Swimming Hall of Fame in 1973
 Inducted into the Sport Australia Hall of Fame in 1986

See also
 List of members of the International Swimming Hall of Fame
 List of Commonwealth Games medallists in swimming (men)
 List of Olympic medalists in swimming (men)
 World record progression 100 metres freestyle
 World record progression 4 × 200 metres freestyle relay

Notes

References

External links

1935 births
Living people
Commonwealth Games gold medallists for Australia
World record setters in swimming
Australian male freestyle swimmers
Olympic gold medalists for Australia
Olympic swimmers of Australia
Sport Australia Hall of Fame inductees
Swimmers from Sydney
Swimmers at the 1954 British Empire and Commonwealth Games
Swimmers at the 1956 Summer Olympics
Swimmers at the 1960 Summer Olympics
USC Trojans men's swimmers
Medalists at the 1956 Summer Olympics
Olympic gold medalists in swimming
Commonwealth Games medallists in swimming
Medallists at the 1954 British Empire and Commonwealth Games